Vernon James Weisgerber  (born May 1, 1938) is a Canadian prelate of the Roman Catholic Church. He is the retired sixth Archbishop of Winnipeg, serving from August 2000 until October 2013.

Early life and education
Weisgerber was born in Vibank, Saskatchewan, to Jack and Catherine Weisgerber. Following his schooling at Vibank, he attended St. Peter's College at Muenster and then St. Paul's University in Ottawa, where he obtained licence degrees in Philosophy and Theology.

Priesthood
He was ordained a priest at Holy Rosary Cathedral in Regina on June 1, 1963, and named a Prelate of Honour on October 16, 1991.

Weisgerber was Dean of Arts at Notre Dame College in Wilcox, where he taught philosophy, religious studies, and French. He worked several years in the Archbishop of Regina's office serving as the director of the pastoral and social justice offices.

In 1990 he was elected General Secretary of the Canadian Conference of Catholic Bishops.

Episcopal career
On March 7, 1996, Weisgerber was appointed the fifth Bishop of Saskatoon by Pope John Paul II. He received his episcopal consecration on the following May 3 from Archbishop Peter Mallon, with Archbishop Joseph MacNeil and Bishop Joseph MacDonald serving as co-consecrators.

Weisgerber was later named the sixth Archbishop of Winnipeg on June 7, 2000. He succeeded Leonard James Wall, and was
installed at St. Mary’s Cathedral on August 24, 2000. In 2005, he received the Saskatchewan Order of Merit. In 2013, he was made an Officer of the Order of Canada "for his work as a champion of reconciliation and social justice, promoting deeper understanding between Aboriginal and non-Aboriginal people".

References

Catholic-Hierarchy.org
Archdiocese of Winnipeg

1938 births
Living people
21st-century Roman Catholic archbishops in Canada
Members of the Saskatchewan Order of Merit
Officers of the Order of Canada
People from Vibank, Saskatchewan
Roman Catholic archbishops of Winnipeg
Roman Catholic bishops of Saskatoon